Tejeda is a village and a municipality in the mountainous central part of the island of Gran Canaria in the province of Las Palmas in the Canary Islands.

Location 

Geography

The south-eastern part of its territory includes the second highest point of Gran Canaria island, Pico de las Nieves ("Snows Peak") - . Other remarkable summits in the municipality are Roque Nublo ("Cloud Rock")  and Roque Bentayga ("Bentayga Rock") with its ritual place (almogarén) and other features. Close by are the cuevas del Rey ("the King's caves", 1 km to the west of Rock Bentayga), an antique cave house village with granaries; and 2 km further west the antique cave house village of Acusa Seca. All these sites are listed Spanish Heritage as Properties of cultural interest ("Bien de Interés Cultural").

Geology : caldera de Tejeda 

The village of Tejeda sits on the eastern edge of a volcanic basin or crater that bears its name (caldera de Tejeda).

The caldera’s dimensions are 28 km x 18 km, with a surface that extends from the head of Agaete's ravine (barranco de Agaete) near Artenara, to Verde Andén ("Green Platform") in the west, Veneguera and the head of Mogán ravine (barranco de Mogán) up to Arguineguín's ravine (barranco de Arguineguin). Only half of its perimeter remains standing; on what is left of it are found a few green-bluish peaks (such as "azulejos" de Veneguera - "Veneguera's tiles") and below these are the oldest basalts of the island, primitive substrate of Grand Canary.

The caldera was produced in  probably less than two hours, by the explosion of the residual magma chambers During the collapse of the caldera de Tejera ignimbrite rock was produced, with a pink matrix dotted with white crystals. It exists because the explosive eruption by which the caldera collapsed was so powerful that the magma was pulverized in a very fine spray and created almost microscopic structures in the matrix rock. Ignimbrita is found on the outside of the periphery of the caldera. 
The caldera also bears traces of a 2 million year period of evolution. This is especially notable at the heads of the Agaete ravine (barranco de Agaete) and Mogan ravine (barranco de Mogan), where we can see horizontal basaltic lavas in their lower parts and, above, thicker material in sloping layers.

Another rare feature of the caldera is its system of conical dykes in its center, that were damaged by the eruptions and determined the structure of the island by their own structure. The lava passed through these dykes during some eruptions, in particular basaltic eruptions ; this created a crack in the surrounding channels where the lava was injected, and from them the volcano arose. In Grand Canary these conical dykes were centered on a focal point located roughly 2 km under sea level, at what was in the past the center of the island. New magma would then tend to also take the same conical shape. Conical dykes of this size are not found in other islands; Vallehermoso on La Gomera island has some smaller ones.

Biologist Juan Sergio Socorro considers this crater to be one of the few clear examples in the world of a very large collapsed volcanic crater, particularly in comparison to the Cañadas del Teide for which several theories are held regarding its formation.

<div align=center>

Iglesia Nuestra Señora del Socorro 

</div align=center>

Population
Its population was 2,028 in 2013.

Neighbouring municipalities

Villages

See also
List of municipalities in Las Palmas

Notes and references

Notes

References

External links 

Municipalities in Gran Canaria